Flying Saucers from Outer Space (Holt, 1953) is a non-fiction book by Donald Keyhoe about unidentified flying objects, aka UFOs.

Adaptation
In 1956 a science-fiction film credited as "suggested by" the book was made under the title Earth vs. the Flying Saucers, also known as Invasion of the Flying Saucers.
The working titles of the film were Attack of the Flying Saucers, Invasion of the Flying Saucers and Flying Saucers from Outer Space. In a letter contained in the film's production file at the AMPAS Library, blacklisted screenwriter Bernard Gordon stated that he wrote the screenplay for this picture using the pseudonym Raymond T. Marcus.

See also  
 The Flying Saucers Are Real (also by Keyhoe)

References

Notes

External links 
 Flying Saucers from Outer Space on line version at NICAP

1953 non-fiction books
Alleged UFO-related aviation incidents
Books about extraterrestrial life
Flying saucers